Kim English, Jr. (born September 24, 1988) is an American former professional basketball player and current head basketball coach for George Mason University. He played college basketball for the University of Missouri before being selected by the Detroit Pistons with the 44th overall pick in the 2012 NBA draft.

Early life
English was born on September 24, 1988, in Baltimore, Maryland. His mother, Brenda Fowlkes, and his father, Kim English Sr. raised English along with his two sisters Bria and Jessica and brother Kalil.

During his senior season at Randallstown High School, English averaged 18.2 points and 7.4 rebounds and was named MVP while leading Randallstown to their third consecutive state championship.

After high school, English attended Notre Dame Preparatory School in Fitchburg, Massachusetts. English averaged 17.3 points, 6.2 rebounds, and 3.9 assists per game in 2007–08 while again earning team MVP honors.

|}

College career
English committed to attend the University of Missouri on September 30, 2007.

As a freshman, English worked his way into the starting lineup, starting 13 out of 16 Big 12 games. In the second round of the 2009 NCAA tournament, with Missouri tied 79–79 with Marquette, English came off the bench to replace an injured J.T. Tiller and hit two free throws to give Missouri an 81–79 lead en route to an 83–79 victory.

English averaged 14 points per game as a sophomore while earning USBWA All-District honors, being named to Dick Vitale's All-Improved Team, and earning Third Team All-Big 12 honors, becoming just the third Mizzou underclassmen to earn All-Big 12 honors.

As a junior English was unable to improve upon his sophomore year campaign, averaging just 10 points per game.

As a senior, English averaged 14.5 points per game and made 45.9% of his three-pointers, earning Third Team All-Big 12 honors for the second time. Leading Mizzou to the 2012 Big 12 men's basketball tournament championship, Mizzou's second Big 12 Tournament Championship in four years, English was named the Big 12 Tournament Most Outstanding Player after averaging 23 points and shooting 78 percent from the field.

With 107 victories in four years, English, with teammates Marcus Denmon and Steve Moore won more games than any senior class in Mizzou basketball history.

Professional career

2012–13 season
English was selected by the Detroit Pistons with the 44th overall pick in the 2012 NBA draft. On July 9, 2012, he joined the Pistons for the 2012 NBA Summer League. On July 12, 2012, he signed with the Pistons. He was assigned to the Fort Wayne Mad Ants on December 12, 2012, and was recalled a week later.

2013–14 season
On July 7, 2013, English joined the Pistons for the 2013 NBA Summer League. On July 11, 2013, he was waived by the Pistons.

On August 26, 2013, English signed with Montepaschi Siena of Italy. In mid-November 2013, he parted ways with Siena after just 9 games. On November 27, 2013, he signed with Chorale Roanne of France for the rest of the season.

2014–15 season
In July 2014, English joined the Orlando Magic for the 2014 NBA Summer League. On September 26, 2014, he signed with the Chicago Bulls. However, he was later waived by the Bulls on October 18, 2014. Nine days later, he returned to France, signing a one-year deal with SLUC Nancy Basket. On December 1, 2014, he left Nancy and signed a one-month deal with French club Cholet Basket. On February 6, 2015, he signed with Venezuelan club Guaros de Lara. On April 26, 2015, he parted ways with Guaros de Lara.

NBA career statistics

Regular season

|-
| style="text-align:left;"| 
| style="text-align:left;"| Detroit
| 41 || 0 || 9.9 || .375 || .280 || .724 || .9 || .6 || .4 || .1 || 2.9
|- class="sortbottom"
| style="text-align:left;"| Career
| style="text-align:left;"|
| 41 || 0 || 9.9 || .375 || .280 || .724 || .9 || .6 || .4 || .1 || 2.9

Coaching career
On May 17, 2015, English was hired by Frank Haith to become an assistant basketball coach for the University of Tulsa.

On August 11, 2017, English was hired by Tad Boyle as an assistant coach for Colorado, replacing Jean Prioleau, who became the new head coach at San Jose State. Two years later, on April 10, 2019, English was hired by Rick Barnes as an assistant for Tennessee. He replaced Rob Lanier on the staff, who was hired as the new head coach at Georgia State.

On March 23, 2021, English was hired as the head coach of George Mason.

Head coaching record

References

External links
 Missouri bio

1988 births
Living people
American expatriate basketball people in France
American expatriate basketball people in Italy
American expatriate basketball people in Venezuela
American men's basketball coaches
American men's basketball players
Basketball players from Baltimore
Cholet Basket players
Chorale Roanne Basket players
Colorado Buffaloes men's basketball coaches
Detroit Pistons draft picks
Detroit Pistons players
Fort Wayne Mad Ants players
George Mason Patriots men's basketball coaches
Mens Sana Basket players
Missouri Tigers men's basketball players
Shooting guards
SLUC Nancy Basket players
Tennessee Volunteers basketball coaches
Tulsa Golden Hurricane men's basketball coaches